B. Murali (born 3 April 1971) is a Malayalam short story writer and a novelist. He is a journalist working in Malayala Manorama.

Works

Collections of short stories
 Umberto Eco
 Poomudikkettazhinjathum Pushpajalam Kozhinjathum
 Kodathi Varanthayile Kafka
 Protozoa
 Haritha Vaisikam
 Kaamuki
 Panchami Bar
 100  stories

Novels
 Alakampadi
 Ninte Chorayile Veenju
 Agamyam

Collection of essays
 Writers Block

Awards for literature
 Sanskriti puraskaram for literature in Indian languages
 Abudabi Sakthi award
 V P Sivakumar memorial keli award
 SBT literary award for short story and Children's literature
 Pune Malayala Sabdam Award
 Altlas Kairali Award
 Ankanam Award
 E.P. Sushama endowment

Award for journalism
 Pandalam Kerala Varma award for best Editorial.

References

Living people
1971 births
Malayalam-language writers
Indian male novelists
Indian male short story writers
21st-century Indian short story writers
21st-century Indian novelists
Novelists from Kerala
21st-century Indian male writers